Crossings may refer to:

 Crossings (Buffy novel), a 2002 original novel based on the U.S. television series Buffy the Vampire Slayer
 Crossings (game), a two-player abstract strategy board game invented by Robert Abbott
 Crossings (Herbie Hancock album), 1972
 Crossings (journal), an academic journal on art
 Crossings (Red Garland album), 1978
 Crossings (Steel novel), a 1982 novel by Danielle Steel
 Crossings (Tony Rice album), 1994
 Crossings (TV miniseries), a 1986 miniseries directed by Karen Arthur, starring Cheryl Ladd and Lee Horsley and
 Crossings (TV series), a Malaysian dark comedy drama series
 Pedestrian crossing, a designated point on a road at which some means are employed to assist pedestrians wishing to cross
 Zebra crossing, also known as a crosswalk

See also

 Crossing (disambiguation)
 The Crossing (disambiguation)